Heather Gemmen (born 4 April 1971) is a Canadian author of children's books but is probably best known for her memoir, Startling Beauty. In this book, she describes becoming pregnant after being sexually assaulted while living and working for community development and racial reconciliation in the inner city. It describes her struggle with the decision to not only carry the baby to term but raise this little girl as her own instead of having an abortion.

Gemmen is an international speaker, opposing abortion and advocating for racial reconciliation, and Christian spiritual growth.

Gemmen's works have been translated into more than ten languages.

Biography 
Heather Gemmen grew up on a hobby farm in Canada. Her father and mother, both immigrants from the Netherlands, were Christian people who opened their home to numerous children in the foster care system—some of whom still claim this family as their own even as adults. Gemmen's siblings by birth are all older than she. Gemmen attended a private Christian school and was surrounded by good friends and relatives all her life.

Gemmen became a United States citizen in 1995. During her marriage, Gemmen gave birth to three children and adopted one other. She used her BA in English to become a professional book editor. In 2004, she and her husband were divorced. Gemmen remarried a year later.

Publications
 I have a friend, 2003
 That's not fair!, 2003
 Quit looking at me!, 2003
 Monsters at night, 2003
 Learn-to-read Bible, 2003
 But it's true!, 2004
 Lydia Barnes and the blood diamond treasure, 2007

External links

 Heather Gemmen

References

1971 births
Living people
American children's writers
Canadian women children's writers
American women children's writers
American women novelists
Canadian women novelists
21st-century Canadian non-fiction writers
21st-century Canadian women writers
Canadian memoirists
21st-century memoirists
Canadian women memoirists
21st-century American women